Antonio Prieto is the name of:

 Antonio Prieto (artist) (1912-1967), California ceramic artist
 Antonio Prieto (Chilean actor) (1926-2011), Chilean actor and singer
 Antonio Prieto (cinematographer), Argentine cinematographer
 Antonio Prieto (runner) (born 1958), Spanish long-distance runner
 Antonio Prieto (Spanish actor) (1905-1965), Spanish actor
 Antonio Prieto (tennis) (born 1973), Brazilian tennis player
 Antonio Prieto (writer) (born 1930), Spanish writer, author of Tres pisadas de hombre

See also
 Juan António Prieto, Spanish Paralympic athlete